Rensvik is a village in Kristiansund Municipality in Møre og Romsdal county, Norway. The village is located on the northern part of the island of Frei, just west of the Omsund Bridge which connects to the island of Nordlandet to the north.

The village of Rensvik was the administrative center of the old Frei Municipality until 2008 when Frei was incorporated into Kristiansund Municipality.

References

Kristiansund
Villages in Møre og Romsdal